Joshua Kurt "Josh" Hayes (born April 4, 1975 in Gulfport, Mississippi) is a professional motorcycle roadracer who started his road racing career at age 19 and made a quick ascension up through the ranks where he won his first three WERA titles in 1994 and numerous others in the following four years. He turned pro in 1996 and also raced in MotoGP. Riding Suzuki GSX-R motorcycles, Hayes won the 1999 750 SuperSport race at Daytona and finished third in the Formula Extreme class for the season. He won the 2003 AMA 750 SuperStock Championship riding an Attack Suzuki GSX-R750, the 2006 and the 2007 AMA Formula Xtreme Championships on an Erion Honda CBR600RR, and four AMA Superbike Championships on a Yamaha YZF-R1 (2010, 2011, 2012, and 2014).

Career

Hayes joined the Yamaha Factory Racing team in 2009 and competed aboard a Yamaha YZF-R1 in the AMA Pro Racing SuperBike Championship, winning seven races en route to second place in the Championship. He also raced a Yamaha YZF-R6 in the Daytona 200.

The 2010 season saw Hayes fulfill his lifelong goal of becoming AMA Pro SuperBike Champion. In the process, he also won Yamaha's first SuperBike title in 19 years, scoring seven race victories and earning multiple bonus points for pole positions and laps led on the season.

Hayes won his second consecutive SuperBike Championship in 2011. He captured seven poles, three wins, and nine podium finishes in defending his championship. He only finished off the podium twice over the course of the entire season, and he won the Championship on the final lap of the final race.

Hayes made his MotoGP debut at the 2011 Valencian Grand Prix riding the Tech 3 Yamaha YZR-M1 as a replacement rider for injured countryman Colin Edwards. Hayes led the wet morning warmup session, and then, he went on to finish seventh in the race.

In 2012, Hayes won his third consecutive SuperBike Championship, and he did it in record-setting fashion, rewriting AMA Pro Road Racing history in several categories. He set a new record for most SuperBike wins in a single season with 16, and he also set a new record for most consecutive SuperBike wins in a single season with 10. In addition, Hayes tied the record for most SuperBike poles in a single season with 10, and he had seven perfect weekends. In seven rounds during the 2012 season, Hayes qualified his #1 Monster Energy/Graves/Yamaha R1 SuperBike in the pole position, won both SuperBike races, and also led the most laps in both races.

Finishing a close second in the 2013 AMA Pro SuperBike points standings to his Monster Energy/Graves/Yamaha teammate and 2013 SuperBike Champion Josh Herrin, Hayes won eight races and earned two additional podiums. He also had a season sweep in qualifying, earning all eight SuperBike pole positions, and he set a new lap record at New Jersey Motorsports Park.

Hayes showed in 2014 that the #4 on his Monster Energy/Graves/Yamaha R1 SuperBike was an omen. On the strength of his 7 race wins and 3 second-place finishes out of 11 races this season, Josh captured his fourth AMA Pro SuperBike Championship. He also won the GEICO Motorcycle Superbike Shootout Championship that same year.

In 2015, Hayes notched 10 Superbike wins during MotoAmerica's inaugural season. He also reached the podium in 16 out of 18 races and earned 5 pole positions. His teammate Cameron Beaubier nipped him by just four points for the 2015 MotoAmerica Superbike title.

In 2016, Hayes finished the MotoAmerica season just six points behind his teammate Beaubier, and it came down to the final race of the season at New Jersey Motorsports Park to decide it all.

Hayes finished fourth in the 2017 MotoAmerica Championship, reaching the podium 8 times, which included a victory at VIRginia International Raceway.

Career statistics

Grand Prix motorcycle racing

By season

Races by year
(key) (Races in bold indicate pole position) (Races in italics indicate fastest lap)

AMA Superbike
(key) (Races in bold indicate pole position) (Races in italics indicate fastest lap)

References

External links 

JoshHayesRacing.com - Official website
Josh Hayes profile at AMAProRacing.com

1975 births
Living people
Sportspeople from Gulfport, Mississippi
American motorcycle racers
AMA Superbike Championship riders
Tech3 MotoGP riders
Supersport World Championship riders
MotoGP World Championship riders